Richard Fletcher (born 17 May 1981) is a former Scotland international rugby league footballer who played as a right-footed goal-kicking  or  in the 1990s, 2000s and 2010s.

He played at representative level for Great Britain (Academy) and Scotland, and at club level in the Super League for Hull F.C. (Heritage No.) and the Castleford Tigers (Heritage No. 838), in the Queensland Cup for the Eastern Suburbs Tigers, and in the Championship for Whitehaven, Widnes Vikings, Barrow Raiders and the Dewsbury Rams.

Background
Fletcher was born in Kingston upon Hull, Humberside.

Playing career

International honours
Fletcher won nine caps for Scotland between 2001 and 2009, scoring two tries. He was forced to rule himself out of the Scotland training squad for the 2008 Rugby League World Cup through personal reasons.

Club career
Fletcher was transferred from the Eastern Suburbs Tigers to Castleford during May 2005. He was later transferred from the Castleford to Whitehaven during February 2007.

References

External links
 
 
 
SCOTLAND RUGBY LEAGUE INTERNATIONAL HONOURS BOARD
Fletcher commits to Hull
Wigan deny Fletcher deal reports
Richard Fletcher Memory Box Search at archive.castigersheritage.com
Richard Memory Box Search at archive.castigersheritage.com
Fletcher Memory Box Search at archive.castigersheritage.com

1981 births
Living people
Barrow Raiders players
Castleford Tigers players
Dewsbury Rams players
Eastern Suburbs Tigers players
English people of Scottish descent
English rugby league players
Hull F.C. players
Rugby league locks
Rugby league players from Kingston upon Hull
Rugby league props
Rugby league second-rows
Scotland national rugby league team players
Whitehaven R.L.F.C. players
Widnes Vikings players